The PLM Open was a golf tournament that was played in Sweden until 1990. Founded in 1983, it was a European Tour event from 1986, and in its final year it had a prize fund of £350,000, which was mid-range for a European Tour event at that time. In 1991, the tournament was merged with the Scandinavian Enterprise Open, with the resultant tournament being called the Scandinavian Masters.

The PLM Open should not be confused with the KLM Open, which was a sponsored name of the Dutch Open.

Winners

Notes

References

External links
Coverage on the European Tour's official site

Former European Tour events
Swedish Golf Tour events
Golf tournaments in Sweden
Recurring sporting events established in 1983
Recurring events disestablished in 1990
Defunct sports competitions in Sweden